The following lists events that happened during 2006 in the Democratic Republic of the Congo.

Incumbents 
 President: Joseph Kabila
 Prime Minister:

Events
 Anvil Mining of Australia bought the Kinsevere, Tshiufa and Nambulwa mines, north-west of Lubumbashi, Mining Company Katanga (MCK), controlled by Moïse Katumbi, governor of Katanga Province. MCK acquired the mines from Gécamines when it was privatized. Anvil's board for several years included Katanga's former governor and presidential advisor . Listed as (AVM) on the Australian (ASX) and Toronto stock exchanges (TSX), Anvil paid 61.3 million dollars for the mines.

June 2006
Dan Gertler buys Tremalt for about $60 million.

July 2006
Nikanor plc's stock listed on the London Stock Exchange's Alternative Investment Market. Initial public offering raises $400 million; capitalization reaches $1.5 billion. Beny Steinmetz owned 36%, Dan Gertler owned 15%.

References

 
2000s in the Democratic Republic of the Congo
Years of the 21st century in the Democratic Republic of the Congo
Democratic Republic of the Congo
Democratic Republic of the Congo